Lukko Naiset or Rauman Lukko Naiset ('Rauma's Lock Women') are an ice hockey team in the Naisten Liiga (NSML). They are based in Rauma, a port city in Satakunta on the southwestern coast of Finland, and play at the Eurajoen jäähalli in Eurajoki. 

Founded in 2011, the team gained promotion to the Naisten Liiga for the 2016–17 season and remained in the Liiga until being relegated at the conclusion of the 2020–21 season. They achieved promotion in the 2021–22 NSML qualification series and returned to the league after one season in the Naisten Mestis.

History
Lukko Naiset are the representative women's ice hockey team of the ice hockey and ringette club Rauman Lukko ry, which also operates a number of junior and recreational teams. They have limited affiliation with Rauman Lukko Oy, which operates the men's Liiga team Lukko.

The team faced relegation four times in their first five seasons in the Naisten Liiga but were able to save themselves in the qualification series each time, until finally being relegated in the 2020–21 season. As of the 2020–21 season, Lukko has never appeared in the Naisten Liiga playoffs. 

Players and personnel

2022–23 roster 

 

Coaching staff and team personnel
 Head coach: Sami Piilikangas
 Assistant coach: Teemu Ekman
 Assistant coach: Niclas Kiviö
 Assistant coach: Hanna Teerialho
 Team manager: Jouni Laaksonen
 Equipment managers: Sami Koskinen

Team captaincy history 
 Annika Järvinen, 2014–2016
 Tiia Koskinen, 2016–2018
 Elviira Ylitalo, 2018–19
 Maija Koski, 2019–

Head coaches 
 Toni Tunturivuori, 2014–15
 Hannu Roos, 2016–2018
 Marko Toivonen, 2018–24 November 2020
 Sami Piilikangas, 24 November 2020–

Notable alumni 
Years active with Lukko listed alongside player names.
 Erika Kytömaa, 2013–2018
 Janica Laine, 2013–2018
 Maija Otamo, 2011–2014
 Eveliina Suonpää, 2016–2018
 Susanna Tapani, 2016–2018

International players
  Andrea Bevan, 2012–13
  Cheyann Newman, 2013–14
  Shelley Payne, 2019–20
  Lyubov Tokar, 2020–21
  Gudrun Vidarsdóttir, 2012–13

References

External links 
  (in Finnish)
Team information and statistics from Eliteprospects.com and Eurohockey.com and Hockeyarchives.info (in French)

Naisten Liiga (ice hockey) teams
Rauma, Finland
2011 establishments in Finland
Sport in Satakunta